Sitria is a moshav in central Israel. Located in the Shfela near Rehovot, it falls under the jurisdiction of Gezer Regional Council.

History
The moshav was founded on Lag BaOmer in 1949 on the land that had belonged to the depopulated   Palestinian village of Abu al-Fadl, by 95 families from Poland and Romania who had been interned in a detention camp in Cyprus. Prior to 1948, the Sitriya Bedouin tribe lived in the area.

Economy
Domaine Herzberg, a boutique winery, is located in Sitria. The moshav also operates a riding stable, Susey Adama.

References

Moshavim
Populated places established in 1949
Populated places in Central District (Israel)
Polish-Jewish culture in Israel
Romanian-Jewish culture in Israel
1949 establishments in Israel